Legislative elections were held in Brazil on 3 October 1990, the first held under the 1988 constitution. The Brazilian Democratic Movement Party emerged as the largest party, winning 109 of the 502 seats in the Chamber of Deputies and 8 of the 31 seats in the Senate.

Results

Chamber of Deputies

Senate

References

General elections in Brazil
Brazil
Legislative
Brazil
Election and referendum articles with incomplete results